David Crawford (9 March 1873 – July 1937) was a Scottish footballer, who played for St Mirren, Rangers and the Scotland national team.

He was part of Rangers' 'perfect season' in the 1898–99 Scottish Division One where they won all 18 fixtures, featuring in the defence in 17 of those matches. Apart from that season, he was a capable reserve for the first team during the rest of his time at the Govan club, whereas in his two spells with hometown club St Mirren he was a regular, but had dropped out of the side by the time they reached the 1908 Scottish Cup Final.

References

External links 

1873 births
1937 deaths
Footballers from Paisley, Renfrewshire
Association football fullbacks
Scottish footballers
Scotland international footballers
St Mirren F.C. players
Rangers F.C. players
Scottish Football League players
Scottish Football League representative players